Zaki is a Local Government Area of Bauchi State, Nigeria. Its headquarters are in the town of  Katagum.
 
It has an area of 1,436 km and a population of 191,457 at the 2006 census.

The postal code of the area is 752.

The predominant ethnic group in the area are the Hausa with some Kanuri and Kare in the east of the area.

The Bade language is spoken in Zaki LGA.

References

Local Government Areas in Bauchi State